Lion's mane may refer to:
Mane (lion), the mane of the adult male lion, the fur around its face
Lion's mane jellyfish
Lion's mane mushroom
Lion's mane nudibranch
"The Adventure of the Lion's Mane", a Sherlock Holmes short story by Sir Arthur Conan Doyle
"Lion's Mane", a song by Iron & Wine from the album The Creek Drank the Cradle

See also
 Lion-Mane, four characters in DC Comics